Jania cultrata is a species of red seaweeds with a global tropical distribution.

References

External links 
 Jania cultrata at AlgaeBase

Corallinaceae
Species described in 2007